Bastilla palpalis is a moth of the family Noctuidae first described by Francis Walker in 1865. It is found in Africa, including Sierra Leone and São Tomé.

The larvae feed on Phyllanthus species.

Subspecies
Bastilla palpalis palpalis
Bastilla palpalis distincta (São Tomé)

References

External links
Holloway, J. D. & Miller, Scott E. (2003). "The composition, generic placement and host-plant relationships of the joviana-group in the Parallelia generic complex". Invertebrate Systematics. 17: 111–128.

Bastilla (moth)
Moths of Africa
Insects of the Democratic Republic of the Congo
Insects of West Africa
Fauna of Gabon
Moths described in 1865